Petit Lac Nominingue is a small lake in Southwest Quebec, located in the Laurentian Mountains about 55 km, by road, northwest of Mont Tremblant. It is connected to Grand Lac Nominingue by a small river that travels under a bridge. The village of Nominingue is located between both Lac Nominingue and Petit Lac Nominingue.

Literature 

 Graham, Joseph Naming the Laurentians: A History of Place Names 'up North'

References 

Lakes of Laurentides